Kamikogawa Dam  is an earthfill dam located in Hokkaido Prefecture in Japan. The dam is used for flood control. The catchment area of the dam is 29.8 km2. The dam impounds about 45  ha of land when full and can store 3677 thousand cubic meters of water. The construction of the dam was started on 1974 and completed in 2003.

References

Dams in Hokkaido